Omfori Island is a private, uninhabited,  island in the Ionian Sea.  the island has one building, a church, and is unpopulated. In 2015, the island was on sale for $61.9 million, and in 2017, it was the most expensive island in Greece and the 9th most expensive in the world, for $60 million. As of 2021, the island is still on sale for $55 to $62 million.

References

Islands of the Ionian Islands (region)
Private islands of Greece
Landforms of Ithaca
Uninhabited islands of Greece